The 1927–28 CPHL season was the second season of the Canadian Professional Hockey League, a minor professional ice hockey league in Ontario, Canada, with one team based in Detroit, Michigan. Eight teams participated in the league, and the Stratford Nationals won the championship.

Regular season

The Toronto Ravinas changed their name to the Toronto Falcons on February 13. The Falcons would finish the season playing games in Brantford, Ontario, as attendance was poor in Toronto. The Falcons thrived in Brantford, passing Hamilton to take fourth place, the final playoff position.

Playoffs

Semifinals

Best of 3

Toronto 0 @ Stratford 4
Stratford 7 Toronto 1 @ Windsor

Stratford Nationals beat Toronto Falcons 2 wins to none.

Kitchener 1 @ Detroit 0
Kitchener 3 @ Detroit 1

Kitchener Millionaires beat Detroit Olympics 2 wins to none.

Both games were played in Detroit because the attendance was larger.

Final

Best of 3

Stratford 1 @ Kitchener 1
Kitchener 1 @ Stratford 6
Stratford 5 Kitchener 0 @ Detroit

Stratford Nationals beat Kitchener Millionaires 2 wins to none, 1 tie.

External links
Season on hockeydb.com

1927 in ice hockey
1928 in ice hockey
1927–28 in Canadian ice hockey by league